Mykola Ivanovych Lykhovydov (born 26 January 1966) is a Ukrainian football coach and a player.

Lykhovydov started his playing career at 45 when he came out on substitution at a home match against FC Torpedo Mykolaiv on 27 April 2011. His professional debut took place few months later on 30 July 2011.

References

External links
 

1966 births
Living people
People from Odesa Oblast
FC Real Pharma Odesa players
Ukrainian footballers
Ukrainian football managers
Ukrainian expatriate football managers
FC Real Pharma Odesa managers
Association football midfielders